Akuluto Assembly constituency is one of the 60 Legislative Assembly constituencies of Nagaland state in India.

It is part of Zünheboto District and is reserved for candidates belonging to the Scheduled Tribes.

Members of the Legislative Assembly

Election results

2018

1969

1964 
In the 1964 elections, Hokishe Sema was uncontested in the polls.

See also
 List of constituencies of the Nagaland Legislative Assembly
 Zunheboto district

References

Zünheboto district
Assembly constituencies of Nagaland